Carmen is a 2003 Russian romantic drama film directed by Aleksandr Khvan.

Plot 
The film tells about the relationship of an honest police officer and a prisoner in a tobacco factory.

Cast 
 Igor Petrenko as Sergey
 Olga Filippova as Carmen
 Yaroslav Boyko as "Squint"
 Aleksandr Sheyn Jr. as Schegol (as Aleksandr Sheyn)
 Ramil Sabitov as Vener
 Aleksey Gorbunov as Defence Lawyer
 Vasiliy Sedykh
 Tamara Sovchi as Dorothea
 Aleksandr Mezentsev as Doctor

References

External links 
 

2003 films
2003 romantic drama films
Films scored by Gennady Gladkov
Films set in Crimea
Russian romantic drama films
2000s Russian-language films
Films based on works by Prosper Mérimée